The White River is a  southeastward flowing river in Wasatch and Utah Counties in eastern Utah. The White River is tributary to the Price River, which is, in turn, tributary to the Green River, and then to the Colorado River.

History
In pioneer times, northbound travelers from the Castle or Price River Valleys ascended along the White River to the Emma and Whitmore Park area east of Soldier Summit and then descended northeast through the Soldier Creek canyon to reach the cities of the Utah and Salt Lake Valleys.

Watershed and Course
Most of the upper watershed is in Wasatch County in the Uinta National Forest, now part of the Wasatch-Cache National Forest. The Left Fork also has a Middle Fork White River tributary. As the White River heads southeast along  U.S. Route 6, it is joined by Tabbyune Creek, before ending at the confluence with the Price River in Colton in Utah County.

Ecology
The White River, and other headwater streams of the Price River, harbor Colorado River cutthroat trout ((Oncorhynchus clarki pleuriticus). The distribution and abundance of this cutthroat trout subspecies are now limited to small populations in less than 1% of its historic range in the upper tributaries of the Colorado River watershed. The chief vulnerability of Colorado River cutthroat trout is hybridization with non-native rainbow trout  and competitive replacement by non-native brown trout (Salmo trutta) and brook trout (Salvelinus fontinalis). Other fish found in the White River watershed include mottled sculpin (Cottus bairdii), speckled dace (Rhinichthys osculus), and mountain sucker (Catostomus platyrhynchus).

See also
 List of Utah rivers

References

External links

Tributaries of the Colorado River in Utah
Rivers of Utah
Rivers of Wasatch County, Utah
Rivers of Utah County, Utah